Gordon Harold "Bill" Andersen (21 January 1924 – 19 January 2005) was a New Zealand communist, social activist and trade union leader.

Biography
Andersen was born in Auckland on 21 January 1924, the youngest child of Hans (Skip) Andersen and Minnie Boneham. He was educated at Panmure School.

Andersen was one of the participants in the 1951 Waterfront Lockout and the president of the Northern Drivers' Union and later the National Distribution Union. He was later the president of the Socialist Unity Party, which broke away from the Communist Party of New Zealand over the Sino-Soviet split, and he also led its successor, the Socialist Party of Aotearoa. One of the very few New Zealanders to take communism seriously, he visited the Soviet Union and kept a bust of Lenin on his desk. 

Andersen's opposition to then National Party Prime Minister Robert Muldoon made him a household name in New Zealand during the 1970s. Whenever the two flew from Auckland to Wellington,  sympathetic NAC and Air New Zealand staff ensured the two leaders were seated next to each other.

Bill Andersen supported the Ngāti Whātua occupation of Bastion Point, now the site of Ōrākei marae. He organised union support for the Māori claiming ownership of the land.

He remained an active trade unionist all his life. In May 2003 he was arrested on a picket line for obstruction. He kept working at the National Distribution Union and Northern Drivers Charitable Trust until the week of his death.

Andersen died on 19 January 2005 aged 80. Despite requests for no funeral, a large group gathered for a memorial ceremony to him at Ōrākei Marae which was attended by workers and activists as well as cabinet ministers, local councillors and mayors.

He is the great-uncle of Labour MP Ginny Andersen.

References

 New Zealand Herald obituary
 Obituary from Paul Watson of Foreign Control Watchdog
 Greens mourn passing of trade unionist

1924 births
2005 deaths
New Zealand left-wing activists
New Zealand communists
New Zealand trade union leaders
New Zealand Socialist Unity Party politicians
Unsuccessful candidates in the 1972 New Zealand general election
Unsuccessful candidates in the 1975 New Zealand general election
Unsuccessful candidates in the 1978 New Zealand general election
Unsuccessful candidates in the 1981 New Zealand general election